BusinessTech is South Africa's largest business news website which was started in 2008 by the media company, Broad Media. The publication's Editor is Quinton Bronkhorst. It features articles on finance, technology, industry, investing, and marketing topics. Its headquarters is located in Centurion, Gauteng, South Africa. Competitors in the business news segment include TimesLIVE, MoneyWeb, and News24.

BusinessTech is the top business news website in South Africa, with a monthly readership of over 6 million.

Conferences 
BusinessTech hosts multiple annual conferences – with its two flagship events the BusinessTech digital banking Conference, and the BusinessTech Online FinTech Conference. The publication's conferences have grown to become the biggest conferences in South Africa.

See also 

 MyBroadband
 News24
 Daily Maverick
 TimesLIVE

References

External links 

 BusinessTech News Website

South African news websites
Online newspapers published in South Africa
2008 establishments in South Africa
Publications established in 2009